Rogers Island (variant: Roger Island) is a Baffin Island offshore island located in the Arctic Archipelago in the territory of Nunavut. The island lies in the Labrador Sea at the mouth of Cornelius Grinnell Bay between the Hall Peninsula and Beekman Peninsula.

References 

Uninhabited islands of Qikiqtaaluk Region
Islands of Baffin Island
Islands of the Labrador Sea